Masochist may refer to:

 Sadomasochism, giving or receiving pleasure from the receipt or infliction of pain or humiliation

Music
 The Prophet (musician) (born 1968), Dutch DJ and producer who has recorded as The Masochist

Albums
 Masochist (album), by Elysia, or the title song, 2006
 Masochist, an EP by the John Steel Singers, 2009

Songs
 “Masochist”, by Christina Aguilera from Liberation, 2018
 "Masochist", by Ingrid Michaelson from Girls and Boys, 2006
 "Masochist", by Pendulum from the compilation Jungle Sound: The Bassline Strikes Back!, 2004
 "Masochist", by Tonedeff from Archetype, 2005
 "The Masochist", by Danko Jones from Rock and Roll Is Black and Blue, 2012

Literature
 The Masochist, a 1972 novel by Barry N. Malzberg
 The Masochists, a 2001 graphic novel by Nick Bertozzi

See also 
 Masochism (disambiguation)
 Sadism (disambiguation)
 Sadist (disambiguation)